Lindsaea microphylla, known as the lacy wedge fern is a small plant found in eastern Australia. A delicate and attractive fern found growing along the edges of rainforest, as well as damp places in woodland and open eucalyptus forest.

References 

Lindsaeaceae
Flora of New South Wales
Flora of Queensland
Flora of Victoria (Australia)
Taxa named by Olof Swartz
Plants described in 1801